Arga may refer to:
 Arga (river), in northern Spain
 Arga metropolitan park (Mancomunidad de la Comarca de Pamplona)
 Arga, Karnataka, a village in Uttara Kannada District, Karnataka, India
 Arga Beach
Arga-Tas, a mountain range in Yakutia, Russia
Arga-Sala, a river in Yakutia, Russia
Arga-Yuryakh, a river in Yakutia, Russia (Omoloy basin)
Arga-Yuryakh (Rassokha), a river in Yakutia, Russia (Alazeya basin)
 Arga, an alternative name for Akçadağ, Turkey